The Oaks, also known as William N. Monroe House, is a Stick/Eastlake Queen Anne Style house that was built in 1885.

History
The house was built for William Newton Monroe, one of the founders and namesake of the city of Monrovia.  Monroe lived in the house for only four years, after which it served a one-year stint as the Monrovia Ladies' College of the University of Southern California.  It again served as a private residence until the 1940s when it became a boarding house. It was converted back a single family house in 1977.

The Oaks is the second oldest house in Monrovia, notable as a local example of Victorian architecture.  It was listed on the National Register of Historic Places in 1978.

References

Houses in Los Angeles County, California
Monrovia, California
Houses completed in 1885
Houses on the National Register of Historic Places in California
National Register of Historic Places in Los Angeles
Queen Anne architecture in California
Stick-Eastlake architecture in California